The X99 is an express bus service operated by Stagecoach Highlands. It is the fastest public transport connection between Inverness and Caithness. The route runs from Inverness to Thurso via Wick, Helmsdale, Brora, Golspie, and Dornoch.

History 
In 2019, the timetable was revised to introduce a comfort break at Dornoch.

During the first COVID-19 lockdown in 2020, passenger numbers fell by over 80%.

Controversy 
New coaches, introduced in 2018, were criticised for alleged accessibility issues. Only three seats and space for one wheelchair user was provided at ground level, with all other passengers having to climb a set of stairs to reach their seat. The coaches were also criticised due to the toilet only being accessible via a steep staircase. In response, Stagecoach stated that the coaches met Disability Discrimination Act standards. The company stated that introducing the new coaches allowed them to increase the capacity of the service.

In 2020, the buses were replaced with Volvo B13 coaches.

Competing services 
In September 2019, Aaron's of Wick introduced a competing service which ran once per day. However, the service was unsuccessful, and was withdrawn the following year.

References 

Bus routes in Scotland
Transport in Highland (council area)